Wunna may refer to:

 Maung Wunna (1945–2011), Burmese filmmaker
 Wunna Maung Lwin (born 1952), Burmese politician
 Wunna (album), a 2020 album by American rapper Gunna
 "Wunna" (song), a song from the album
 Wunna Dam and Wunna river, near Nagpur, Maharashtra, India

See also
 Wuna of Wessex (7th–8th century), Anglo-Saxon noblewoman and Christian saint